Cratena is a genus of sea slugs, aeolid nudibranchs, marine gastropod molluscs in the family Facelinidae.

Cratena is the type genus of the subfamily Crateninae.

Species
Species within the genus Cratena include:
 Cratena affinis  (Baba, 1949)
 Cratena capensis Barnard, 1927 - orange-eyed nudibranch
 Cratena lineata  Eliot, 1905
 Cratena minor Padula, Araújo, Matthews-Cascon & Schrödl, 2014
 Cratena pawarshindeorum Bharate, Padula, Apte & Shimpi, 2020
 Cratena peregrina (Gmelin, 1791)
 Cratena pilata (Gould, 1870)
 Cratena poshitraensis Bharate, Padula, Apte & Shimpi, 2020
 Cratena scintilla Ortea & Moro, 1998
 Cratena simba Edmunds, 1970
 Cratena tema Edmunds, 2015 
Taxa inquirenda
 Cratena cornuta (Risbec, 1928) 
 Cratena diffusa (Risbec, 1928) 
 Cratena grisea (Risbec, 1928)
Species brought into synonymy
 Cratena anulata Baba, 1949: synonym of Cuthona anulata (Baba, 1949)
 Cratena cavanca Bergh, 1898: synonym of Phidiana lottini (Lesson, 1831)
 Cratena exigua Thiele, 1912: synonym of Cuthona georgiana (Pfeffer in Martens & Pfeffer, 1886)
 Cratena fructuosa Bergh, 1892: synonym of Cuthona fructuosa (Bergh, 1892)
 Cratena genovae O'Donoghue, 1929: synonym of Cuthona genovae (O'Donoghue, 1929)
 Cratena gymnota (Couthouy, 1838): synonym of Cuthona gymnota (Couthouy, 1838)
 Cratena hirsuta Bergh, 1864: synonym of Cuthona nana (Alder & Hancock, 1842)
 Cratena kaoruae Marcus, 1957: synonym of Cratena pilata (Gould, 1870)
 Cratena lugubris Bergh, 1870: synonym of Phestilla lugubris (Bergh, 1870)
 Cratena macphersonae Burn, 1962: synonym of Phyllodesmium macphersonae (Burn, 1962)
 Cratena nigricolora Baba, 1955: synonym of Catriona nigricolora (Baba, 1955)
 Cratena pinnifera Baba, 1949: synonym of Catriona pinnifera (Baba, 1949)
 Cratena piutaensis Ortea, Caballer & Espinosa, 2003: synonym of Anetarca piutaensis (Ortea, Caballer & Espinosa, 2003)
 Cratena puellula Baba, 1955: synonym of Cuthona puellula (Baba, 1955)
 Cratena pusilla Bergh, 1898: synonym of Cuthona pusilla (Bergh, 1898)
 Cratena valentini Eliot, 1907: synonym of Cuthona valentini (Eliot, 1907)
 Cratena venusta Baba, 1949: synonym of Catriona venusta (Baba, 1949)
 Cratena veronicae A. E. Verrill, 1880: synonym of Cuthona veronicae (A. E. Verrill, 1880)
 Cratena vittata (Alder & Hancock, 1842): synonym of Eubranchus vittatus (Alder & Hancock, 1842)
 Cratena yatsui Baba, 1930: synonym of Herviella yatsui (Baba, 1930)

References

 Bergh R. 1864. Anatomiske bidrag til kundskab om Aeolidierne. Det Kongelige Videnskabernes Selskabs Skrifter, Naturvidenskabelige og Mathematiske Afdeling, 7: 139–316
 ICZN. (1966). Opinion 776. Cratena Bergh, 1864 (Gastropoda): Added to the Official List of Generic Names. Bulletin of Zoological Nomenclature. 23: 93-94
 Paper on nomenclature

Facelinidae